Labdia oxysema is a moth in the family Cosmopterigidae. It is found in Australia, where it has been recorded from Queensland and New South Wales.

References

Natural History Museum Lepidoptera generic names catalog

Labdia
Moths described in 1897